The 2011 WGC-HSBC Champions was a golf tournament played from 3–6 November 2011 at the Sheshan Golf Club in Shanghai, China. It was the third WGC-HSBC Champions tournament, and the fourth of four World Golf Championships events held in 2011. Former PGA Champion Martin Kaymer surged through the final day field to claim his first WGC win.

Kaymer's 268 (−20) winning total was the lowest since the tournament became a World Golf Championship, and matched the lowest in the history of the HSBC Champions, set by David Howell in 2005, before WGC status was awarded.

Field
The following is a list of players who have qualified for the 2011 WGC-HSBC Champions. Players who have qualified from multiple categories are listed in the first category in which they are eligible. The numbers of other qualifying categories are in parentheses next to the player's name.

1. Winners of the four major championships and The Players Championship
Keegan Bradley (3,13), K. J. Choi (12), Darren Clarke (13), Rory McIlroy (12), Charl Schwartzel (8,12)

2. Winners of the previous four World Golf Championships
Francesco Molinari (13), Adam Scott (10,12), Nick Watney (3,12)
Qualified but did not play: Luke Donald (5,12,13)

3. Winners of the top 23 rated PGA Tour  events (35 events met rating)
Aaron Baddeley (13), Jonathan Byrd (13), Harrison Frazar, Lucas Glover, Bill Haas (12), Freddie Jacobson (13), D. A. Points, Justin Rose (12), Rory Sabbatini, David Toms (12), Mark Wilson (13)
Qualified but did not play: Dustin Johnson (12), Martin Laird (13), Phil Mickelson (12), Sean O'Hair, Webb Simpson (12,13), Brandt Snedeker (13), Steve Stricker (12,13), Bubba Watson (12,13), Gary Woodland (13)

4. Top 5 available players from the FedEx Cup points list
Hunter Mahan (12), Geoff Ogilvy (9,13), Chez Reavie, John Senden, Bo Van Pelt
Qualified but did not play: Jason Day (12), Charles Howell III, Matt Kuchar (12)

5. Winners of the top 23 rated European Tour events (26 events met rating)
Thomas Aiken (8), Thomas Bjørn (13), Paul Casey (12), Nicolas Colsaerts, Simon Dyson (13), Michael Hoey, Robert Karlsson (12), Martin Kaymer (12), Pablo Larrazábal, Paul Lawrie, Tom Lewis, Alex Norén, Álvaro Quirós (13), Robert Rock, Lee Slattery
Qualified but did not play: Sergio García (13), Thomas Levet

6. Top 5 available players from the Race to Dubai
Anders Hansen (13), Peter Hanson (13), Miguel Ángel Jiménez (13), Ian Poulter (10,12), Lee Westwood (8,10,12)

7. Five players - winners of the top Japan Golf Tour events, remainder from Order of Merit (23 events met rating)
Hiroyuki Fujita, Yuta Ikeda (13), Hwang Jung-gon, Michio Matsumura, Tetsuji Hiratsuka

8. Five players - winners of the top Sunshine Tour events, remainder from Order of Merit (4 events met rating)
Ernie Els (13), Keith Horne (OoM), Jbe' Kruger (OoM), Pablo Martín, Louis Oosthuizen (OoM)

9. Five players - winners of the top PGA Tour of Australasia events, remainder from Order of Merit (3 events met rating)
Stuart Appleby, Adam Bland (OoM), Bobby Gates (OoM), Jim Herman (OoM), Alistair Presnell (OoM)
Qualified but did not play: Peter Senior

10. Nine players - winners of the top Asian Tour events, remainder from Order of Merit (5 events met rating)
Kiradech Aphibarnrat (OoM), Chan Yih-shin (OoM), Chinnarat Phadungsil (OoM), Shiv Chawrasia, David Gleeson (OoM), Matteo Manassero (13), Siddikur Rahman (OoM), Jeev Milkha Singh (OoM), Thongchai Jaidee (OoM)

11. Four players from China
Liang Wenchong, Wu Ashun, Yuan Hao, Zhang Xinjun

12. Any players, not included in above categories, in the top 25 of the OWGR on October 17, 2011
Kim Kyung-tae, Graeme McDowell
Qualified but did not play: Rickie Fowler

13. If needed to fill the field of 78 players, winners of additional tournaments, ordered by field strength (12 from PGA Tour, 3 from European Tour, 18 from Japan Golf Tour), alternating with those players ranked after the top 25 in OWGR on October 17, 2011
Players in bold were added to the field through this category. Players listed in "()" already qualified in a previous category. Players listed with their name stricken did not play or were not listed as alternates when the field was announced.
.

Round summaries

First round

Second round

Third round

Final round

Scorecard

Cumulative tournament scores, relative to par
Source:

References

External links
Coverage on European Tour's official site
Coverage on PGA Tour's official site
Coverage on Asian Tour's official site

WGC-HSBC Champions
WGC-HSBC Champions
WGC-HSBC Champions
WGC-HSBC Champions